The Financial Transactions and Reports Analysis Centre of Canada (FINTRAC) is the national financial intelligence agency of Canada. FINTRAC was established in 2000 under the Proceeds of Crime (Money Laundering) Act to facilitate detection and investigation of money laundering, FINTRAC's mandate was expanded in December 2001 following amendments to the Proceeds of Crime Act to also disclose financial intelligence to other Canadian intelligence and law enforcement agencies with respect to suspected terrorist financing. FINTRAC's mandate was further expanded in 2006 under Bill C-25 to enhance the client identification, record-keeping and reporting measures, established a registration regime for money services businesses and foreign exchange dealers, and created new offences for not registering.

FINTRAC has been a member of the Egmont Group of Financial Intelligence Units, an international organization of financial intelligence bodies, since June 2002.

Activities
FINTRAC receives information from regulated entities on:

 Suspicious transactions
 Suspected terrorist property
 Large cash transactions
 Outgoing or Incoming International Electronic funds transfer over $10,000 CAD within a 24-hour period
 Cross border currency reporting

In 2009, FINTRAC estimated that  the amount of money laundered on an annual basis is somewhere between $5 and  $15 billion.

FINTRAC publishes annual results, quarterly updates, performance reports, and notices.

FINTRAC analyzes approximately 19 million transactions per year. In 2017, FINTRAC made 2,000 disclosures to police forces.

Directors

The Director is appointed by the Governor-in-Council for a term of not more than five years during the pleasure of the Governor General and on the expiry of a first or subsequent term of office but no person shall hold office as Director for terms of more than ten years in the aggregate.

 Sarah Paquet, November 18, 2020
 Nada Semaan, March 5, 2018
 Barry MacKillop (Interim Director), October 18, 2017 - March 4, 2018.
 Gérald Cossette, October 15, 2012 – October 17, 2017
 Jeanne M. Flemming, March 3, 2008 – 2012
 Keith Fernandez, acting director, 2007 - 2008
 Horst Intscher, 2000 - 2007

Reports

Depending on reporting entities activities the following reports  are to be filed with FINTRAC.

 Suspicious transactions
 Large cash transactions
 Electronic funds transfers
 Casino disbursements
 Terrorist property
 Alternative to large cash transaction reports

FINTRAC can also receive the following information.

 Cross-border currency or monetary instruments reports
 Voluntary Information

Oversight

FINTRAC reports to the Parliament of Canada through the Minister of Finance. Section 72(2) of the Proceeds of Crime (Money Laundering and Terrorist Financing) Act also mandates audits of FINTRAC by the Privacy Commissioner of Canada every two years.

Since 2019 its national security and intelligence activities are subject to oversight by the National Security and Intelligence Review Agency and the National Security and Intelligence Committee of Parliamentarians.

Criticism
In 2009, the Privacy Commissioner of Canada reported that FINTRAC was receiving and retaining personal information beyond its remit, in breach of the Privacy Act, and that this "presents an unquestionable risk to privacy by making available for use or disclosure personal information which should never have been obtained."

See also

 Anti-money laundering
 FinCEN
 Financial transaction tax
 Suspicious activity report
 Tax avoidance and tax evasion
 Office of Terrorism and Financial Intelligence (United States)

References

External links
 

Security Intelligence Service
Federal departments and agencies of Canada
Public Safety Canada
2000 establishments in Ontario
Financial regulation in Canada
Financial crime prevention
Tax evasion
Financial regulatory authorities of Canada
Counterterrorism in Canada
Financial reporting
Government agencies established in 2000